On 4th February 1986, President of Sri Lanka J. R. Jayewardene awarded the first Sri Lankan national honours since the suspension of Imperial honors in 1956.

Sri Lankabhimanya 
 Ranasinghe Premadasa - Prime Minister of Sri Lanka

Deshamanya 
 P. R. Anthonis – surgeon and academic 
 Gamani Corea – economist, civil servant and diplomat
 M. C. M. Kaleel
 Malage George Victor Perera Wijewickrama Samarasinghe
 Miliani Sansoni – Chief Justice of Ceylon
 Victor Tennekoon – Chief Justice of Ceylon

Deshabandu 
 Ahangamage Tudor Ariyaratne 
 Hewa Komanage Dharmadasa
 Norendradas Jayaratnam Wallooppillai
 Daphne Attygalle
 Wimala de Silva
 Arulanandam Yesuadian Samuel Gnanam
 David Edwin Hettiarachchi
 Dhamital Senakumar Jayasundera
 Clara Motwani

References

Sri Lanka National Honours
National Honours
Civil awards and decorations of Sri Lanka